The Rax-Schneeberg Group is a mountain range in the Northern Limestone Alps on the Styrian-Lower Austrian border in Austria.

Location 
According to the official classification of the Eastern Alps by the Alpine Club (Alpenvereinseinteilung der Ostalpen), the Rax-Schneeberg Group is bounded by the following divisions to neighbouring groups of mountains:

 to the north by the Klostertaler Gscheid – Klausgraben – Mamauwiese – Sebastiansbach – Puchberg
 to the northeast by the valley of the River Sierning as far as Ternitz
 to the south by the line: Ternitz – Schwarza near Gloggnitz – Schottwien – Semmering – Mürzzuschlag – Mürz near Kapellen
 to the west by the Altenberg valley – Naßkamm – Naßbach – Schwarza – Voisbach as far as the Klostertaler Gscheid.

Summits 
Its nearby twin peak is known as the Kaiserstein. The two summits are the highest mountains in the state of Lower Austria. The highest two elevations in the Rax massif are the Heukuppe at 2,007 m and the Scheibwaldhöhe at 1,943 m.

Other peaks are the Große Scheibe (1,473 m), the Tratenkogel (1,565 m), the Ochnerhöhe (1,403 m) and the Kreuzberg (1,084 m).

Protected areas 
The Rax Alpine region, together with the Schneealpe and Schneeberg belong to the river source protected area (Quellschutzgebiet) of the First Vienna Mountain Spring Pipeline  (I. Wiener Hochquellenwasserleitung). The Schneeberg and Rax are separated by the Höllental valley and are two of Vienna's "local mountains" or Hausberge.

The Schneeberg and Rax lie within the Northeastern Border Alps: Hohe Wand-Schneeberg-Rax Special Area of Conservation (FFH-Gebiet Nordöstliche Randalpen: Hohe Wand-Schneeberg-Rax).

Schneeberg Railway 
The Schneeberg has been linked for over 100 years by the Schneeberg Railway (Schneebergbahn), a cog railway that climbs to a height of 1,800 m. The twin peaks may be reached from the valley station in one to two hours. The footpath runs eastwards over the Hengst or westwards through the Fadenwände.

There are trails to the Rax from the mountain spa of Puchberg am Schneeberg, and from the wild Höllental valley to the south. In addition the Schneeberg may be approached from Payerbach, Prigglitz and Reichenau via the Gahns.

References

External links 

 Bergsteigen.at: information about scrambling tours and huts in the Schneeberg/Rax region

 
Mountain ranges of the Alps
Northern Limestone Alps
Mountain ranges of Lower Austria
Mountain ranges of Styria